Lisandra Isabel Joaquim Salvador (born 6 August 1990) is an Angolan handball player. She plays for the club Primeiro de Agosto, and on the Angolan national team. She represented Angola at the 2013 World Women's Handball Championship in Serbia.

References

Angolan female handball players
1990 births
Living people